Pukenui is a locality on the southwest side of Houhora Harbour on the Aupouri Peninsula of Northland, New Zealand.  runs through it. The name means "large hill" in the Māori language.

Demographics
Statistics New Zealand describes Pukenui as a rural settlement. Pukenui is part of the larger North Cape statistical area.

Pukenui had a population of 708 at the 2018 New Zealand census, an increase of 93 people (15.1%) since the 2013 census, and an increase of 117 people (19.8%) since the 2006 census. There were 294 households, comprising 351 males and 354 females, giving a sex ratio of 0.99 males per female, with 114 people (16.1%) aged under 15 years, 75 (10.6%) aged 15 to 29, 321 (45.3%) aged 30 to 64, and 192 (27.1%) aged 65 or older.

Ethnicities were 78.0% European/Pākehā, 37.7% Māori, 3.0% Pacific peoples, 1.3% Asian, and 2.5% other ethnicities. People may identify with more than one ethnicity.

Of those people who chose to answer the census's question about religious affiliation, 47.9% had no religion, 36.4% were Christian, 4.2% had Māori religious beliefs, 0.4% were Muslim, 0.4% were Buddhist and 1.3% had other religions.

Of those at least 15 years old, 51 (8.6%) people had a bachelor or higher degree, and 174 (29.3%) people had no formal qualifications. 72 people (12.1%) earned over $70,000 compared to 17.2% nationally. The employment status of those at least 15 was that 234 (39.4%) people were employed full-time, 102 (17.2%) were part-time, and 24 (4.0%) were unemployed.

Education
Pukenui School is a coeducational full primary (years 1-8) school with a roll of  students as of 
The school first opened in 1896.

References

Far North District
Populated places in the Northland Region